Kyōgo, Kyogo or Kyougo (written: 亨梧 or 恭吾) is a masculine Japanese given name. Notable people with the name include:

, Japanese footballer
, Japanese singer-songwriter

Japanese masculine given names